Erodium is a genus of flowering plants in the botanical family Geraniaceae. The genus includes about 60 species, native to North Africa, Indomalaya, the Middle East, and Australia. They are perennials, annuals, or subshrubs, with five-petalled flowers in shades of white, pink, and purple, that strongly resemble the better-known Geranium (cranesbill). Cultivated plants are known as filarees or heron's bill in North America, whereas in the British Isles they are usually called storksbills.

Taxonomy 
Carl Linnaeus grouped in the same genus (Geranium), the three similar genera Erodium, Geranium, and Pelargonium. The distinction between them was made by Charles Louis L'Héritier de Brutelle based on the number of stamens or anthers: five for Erodium, seven for Pelargonium, and ten for Geranium. However, the three genera have the same characteristics in regard to their fruit, which resemble long bird beaks. That characteristic is the basis for the names: Geranium evokes the crane (Greek geranos), Pelargonium the stork (pelargos), and Erodium the heron (erodios).

Cultivation 
In cultivation, erodiums are usually seen in rockeries or alpine gardens.

The hybrid cultivar E. × variabile 'Roseum' (E. corsicum × E. reichardii), a compact, spreading perennial with rose-pink flowers in summer, has gained the Royal Horticultural Society's Award of Garden Merit.

Ecology 
Erodium species are used as food plants by the larvae of some Lepidoptera species including the pasture day moth.

Species 

, the World Checklist of Selected Plant Families accepts 119 species:

Hybrids include:
Erodium × anaristatum Andreas
Erodium × bolosii Romo
Erodium × fallax Jord.
Erodium × viscosum Salzm. ex Delile

Uses 
Species such as E. cicutarium and E. moschatum are edible.

See also 
Wool alien

References

Further reading
 
 

 
Geraniales genera